Storvreten is a residential area in Tumba, Botkyrka. Storvreten was built during the late 1960s and early 1970s. The proportion of inhabitants with a foreign background in (2003) was 38,6 %.

See also
Million Programme

Populated places in Botkyrka Municipality
Tumba, Sweden